Major-General Sir David Watson,  (7 February 1869 – 19 February 1922) was a Canadian journalist, newspaper owner, and General.

Biography 
Born in Quebec City, Quebec, the son of William Watson and Jane Grant, Watson was a journalist with the Quebec Morning Chronicle (later called just Quebec Chronicle). He later became general manager of the paper and general manager of its publisher.

He started his military career as a private in the 8th Regiment, Royal Rifles. He was promoted to lieutenant and then to captain in 1903, major in 1910, and lieutenant-colonel in 1912. In 1914, he enlisted in the Canadian Expeditionary Force and was soon given command of the 2nd Battalion, CEF. He was promoted to Brigadier-General in 1915 and took command of the 5th Brigade, 2nd Canadian Division. He was promoted to Major-General and took command of the 4th Canadian Division upon its creation in 1916. He led his various commands in most of the major Canadian battles of World War I including Second Ypres, the Somme, Vimy Ridge, Passchendaele, Amiens, Second Arras, and Cambrai.

In late 1917, he and Victor Odlum saved their commanding officer, Arthur Currie, from a career-ending charge of embezzlement by lending Currie enough money so that he could repay a large sum he had borrowed from regimental funds before the war.

After the war, he resumed his job at the Quebec Chronicle and became the majority owner. He was also chairman of the Quebec Harbour Commission. He died in 1922.

Honours
Croix de guerre – France
Croix de guerre – Belgium
C.M.G., 1917.
C.B., 1916.
K.C.B., 1918.

Bibliography

References

1869 births
1922 deaths
Canadian Expeditionary Force officers
Canadian Companions of the Order of St Michael and St George
Canadian Knights Commander of the Order of the Bath
People from Quebec City
Recipients of the Croix de guerre (Belgium)
Recipients of the Croix de Guerre 1914–1918 (France)
Canadian generals of World War I
Canadian Militia officers
Canadian military personnel from Quebec